Justin Collins (born 1974, also known as Gus) is a New Zealand former rugby union player. His usual position was flanker.

Collins was born in Tasmania in 1974 and moved to Whangarei in 1984. He started playing rugby for Kamo High School, before progressing to Whangarei club rugby and then provincial rugby for Northland, for whom he made 114 appearances.

He was selected for the Chiefs in Super Rugby in 1998. The following year the territories of the Chiefs and the Blues switched, and Collins made his Blues debut against the Highlanders. He made 92 appearances for the Blues, scoring seven tries and 35 points, before retiring in 2009 due to series of concussions.

After his playing career he joined the board of the New Zealand Rugby Players Association, his work for which was recognised with the Kirk Award in 2016.

Personal life 
Collins has been married since 2004, and has two daughters born 2002 and 2004.

References

1974 births
Living people
New Zealand rugby union players
Highlanders (rugby union) players
Chiefs (rugby union) players
Northland rugby union players
Rugby union players from Tasmania
People educated at Kamo High School
Rugby union flankers